Wahlbergøya is an island in Hinlopen Strait, between Spitsbergen and Nordaustlandet of the Svalbard archipelago. The islands highest point is 194 m.a.s.l. Named after Swedish botanist Peter Fredrik Wahlberg. It is the largest island of Vaigattøyane.

The island is included in the Nordaust-Svalbard Nature Reserve.

References

Islands of Svalbard